OpenFlight (or .flt) is a 3d geometry model file format originally developed by Software Systems Inc. for its MultiGen real-time 3d modeling package in 1988. Originally called Flight, the format was designed as a nonproprietary 3d model format for use by real-time 3d visual simulation image generators. The format was later renamed to OpenFlight to denote its nonproprietary image generation (IG) usage.  The MultiGen modeling package (known now as Creator) and the OpenFlight format were rapidly adopted by the early commercial flight simulation industry in the later 1980s and early 1990s. NASA Ames was the first customer for the MultiGen modeling package.

The early advantage OpenFlight held over many 3d geometry model file formats (.obj, .dxf, .3ds) was its specific real-time 3d graphics industry design.  This means that the format is polygon based (rather than NURB surfaces), and provides a real-time tree structure essential for real-time IG systems.  Most early graphics file formats, such as Wavefront Technologies, or Alias Systems Corporation, tried to focus more on visual aesthetics for non-real-time based rendering graphics packages.

The OpenFlight file format is still widely used today in the high end real-time visual simulation industry as the standard interchange format between different IG systems, and is currently administrated by Presagis.

File format

Associated File Formats 
OpenFlight models can have several associated files in different formats, that define elements such as material characteristics or shaders.

Versions and History

API

Modeling Tools 
There are several modeling tools currently on the market that both read and write the OpenFlight file format.  The standard bearer of the file format Presagis Creator offers the widest compatibility with the file format.

Vendor specific alterations 
Because the OpenFlight file format allows for vendor specific data field additions, some modeling and simulation tools might not fully support vendor specific additions to the file format.

References

External links 
OpenFlight Specification

3D computer graphics
Graphics file formats
Graphics standards
Virtual reality
IRIX software